The 2016 NCAA Division II Field Hockey Championship is the 28th women's collegiate field hockey tournament to determine the top NCAA Division II college field hockey team in the United States. The semifinals and championship match will be played at W.B. Mason Stadium at Stonehill College in Easton, Massachusetts from November 18 to 20, 2016.

Shippensburg defeated LIU Post, 2–0, in the final, the Raiders' second national title.

Qualified teams
 The total number of teams remained fixed at 6. Teams qualified for the tournament based on their regional rankings at the end of the season, with the top three teams from each region making the final bracket.

Atlantic Region

East Region

Bracket

See also 
NCAA Division I Field Hockey Championship
NCAA Division III Field Hockey Championship

References 

2016
2016 in American women's sports
2016 in women's field hockey
2016 in sports in Pennsylvania